Daniel Malloy Tobin (October 19, 1910 – November 26, 1982) was an American supporting actor on the stage, in films and on television. He generally played gentle, urbane, rather fussy, sometimes obsequious and shifty characters, often with a concealed edge of malice.

Early years
Tobin was a native of Cincinnati, and he attended the University of Cincinnati.

Career
Tobin acted with a touring troupe in England. After an impresario saw him in Ah, Wilderness!, he gained a role in Behind Your Back at the Strand.

Tobin's most memorable roles were as the overbearing secretary, Gerald, in Woman of the Year (1942), and the top-billed scientist in Orson Welles's innovative Peabody Award-winning unsold television pilot, The Fountain of Youth, filmed in 1956 and televised once two years later as an installment of NBC's Colgate Theatre. Tobin's final film role was opposite John Huston in Welles's The Other Side of the Wind, shot in the early 1970s and released in 2018.

Tobin also played as Alexander "Sandy" Lord in the original Broadway production of Phillip Barry's The Philadelphia Story, thus starting his career on stage in 1939. His work on Broadway included American Holiday (1939).

On television, Tobin was a regular on I Married Joan, My Favorite Husband,, Mr. Adams and Eve, and Where Were You? 

TV Guide credits him with 44 appearances. In 1965, he appeared in an episode of The Cara Williams Show. In 1966, he became a regular during the final season of Perry Mason as the proprietor of "Clay's Grill". He made a prior Mason appearance in 1964 as Dickens the butler in "The Case of the Scandalous Sculptor."

Personal life 
Tobin was married to film and television screenwriter Jean Holloway (born Gratia Jean Casey) from 1951 to his death in 1982. They met on the set of The First Hundred Years.

Death
Tobin died in Saint John's Hospital in Santa Monica, California, in November 1982, at age 72. He was survived by his wife.

Filmography

References

External links

1910 births
1982 deaths
American male stage actors
American male film actors
American male television actors
20th-century American male actors
Actors from Cincinnati